Peterborough TMD is a traction maintenance depot located in Peterborough, Cambridgeshire, England. The depot is situated on the East Coast Main Line, to the north of Peterborough station.

The depot code is PB.

History
The depot was opened by British Rail in March 1969.

Present 
From 2015, the depot has no allocation. It is, instead, a stabling point for DRS Class 37 locomotives.

References

Sources

 Railway depots in England
Rail transport in Cambridgeshire